A by-election was held in Harborough in 1891.

Results

References 

1891 elections in Europe
By-elections to the Parliament of the United Kingdom in Leicestershire constituencies
1891 elections in the United Kingdom